Granulocyte colony-stimulating factor (G-CSF or GCSF), also known as colony-stimulating factor 3 (CSF 3), is a glycoprotein that stimulates the bone marrow to produce granulocytes and stem cells and release them into the bloodstream.

Functionally, it is a cytokine and hormone, a type of colony-stimulating factor, and is produced by a number of different tissues. The pharmaceutical analogs of naturally occurring G-CSF are called filgrastim and lenograstim.

G-CSF also stimulates the survival, proliferation, differentiation, and function of neutrophil precursors and mature neutrophils.

Biological function 
G-CSF is produced by endothelium, macrophages, and a number of other immune cells. The natural human glycoprotein exists in two forms, a 174- and 177-amino-acid-long protein of molecular weight 19,600 grams per mole. The more-abundant and more-active 174-amino acid form has been used in the development of pharmaceutical products by recombinant DNA (rDNA) technology.

White blood cells The G-CSF-receptor is present on precursor cells in the bone marrow, and, in response to stimulation by G-CSF, initiates proliferation and differentiation into mature granulocytes. G-CSF stimulates the survival, proliferation, differentiation, and function of neutrophil precursors and mature neutrophils. G-CSF regulates them using Janus kinase (JAK)/signal transducer and activator of transcription (STAT) and Ras/mitogen-activated protein kinase (MAPK) and phosphatidylinositol 3-kinase (PI3K)/protein kinase B (Akt) signal transduction pathway.

Hematopoietic System G-CSF is also a potent inducer of hematopoietic stem cell (HSC) mobilization from the bone marrow into the bloodstream, although it has been shown that it does not directly affect the hematopoietic progenitors that are mobilized.

Neurons G-CSF can also act on neuronal cells as a neurotrophic factor. Indeed, its receptor is expressed by neurons in the brain and spinal cord. The action of G-CSF in the central nervous system is to induce neurogenesis, to increase the neuroplasticity and to counteract apoptosis. These properties are currently under investigations for the development of treatments of neurological diseases such as cerebral ischemia.

Genetics
The gene for G-CSF is located on chromosome 17, locus q11.2-q12. Nagata et al. found that the GCSF gene has 4 introns, and that 2 different polypeptides are synthesized from the same gene by differential splicing of mRNA.

The 2 polypeptides differ by the presence or absence of 3 amino acids. Expression studies indicate that both have authentic GCSF activity.

It is thought that stability of the G-CSF mRNA is regulated by an RNA element called the G-CSF factor stem-loop destabilising element.

Medical use

Chemotherapy-induced neutropenia 

Chemotherapy can cause myelosuppression and unacceptably low levels of white blood cells (leukopenia), making patients susceptible to infections and sepsis. G-CSF stimulates the production of granulocytes, a type of white blood cell. In oncology and hematology, a recombinant form of G-CSF is used with certain cancer patients to accelerate recovery and reduce mortality from neutropenia after chemotherapy, allowing higher-intensity treatment regimens. It is administered to oncology patients via subcutaneous or intravenous routes. A QSP model of neutrophil production and a PK/PD model of a cytotoxic chemotherapeutic drug (Zalypsis) have been developed to optimize the use of G-CSF in chemotherapy regimens with the aim to prevent mild-neutropenia.

G-CSF was first trialled as a therapy for neutropenia induced by chemotherapy in 1988. The treatment was well tolerated and a dose-dependent rise in circulating neutrophils was noted.

A study in mice has shown that G-CSF may decrease bone mineral density.

G-CSF administration has been shown to attenuate the telomere loss associated with chemotherapy.

Use in drug-induced neutropenia
Neutropenia can be a severe side effect of clozapine, an antipsychotic medication in the treatment of schizophrenia. G-CSF can restore neutrophil count. Following a return to baseline after stopping the drug, it may sometimes be safely rechallenged with the added use of G-CSF.

Before blood donation
G-CSF is also used to increase the number of hematopoietic stem cells in the blood of the donor before collection by leukapheresis for use in hematopoietic stem cell transplantation. For this purpose, G-CSF appears to be safe in pregnancy during implantation as well as during the second and third trimesters. Breastfeeding should be withheld for 3 days after CSF administration to allow for clearance of it from the milk. People who have been administered colony-stimulating factors do not have a higher risk of leukemia than people who have not.

Stem cell transplants
G-CSF may also be given to the receiver in hematopoietic stem cell transplantation, to compensate for conditioning regimens.

Side effect
The skin disease Sweet's syndrome is a known side effect of using this drug.

History 
Mouse granulocyte-colony stimulating factor (G-CSF) was first recognised and purified in Walter and Eliza Hall Institute, Australia in 1983, and the human form was cloned by groups from Japan and Germany/United States in 1986.
 
The FDA approved the first biosimilar of Neulasta in June 2018. It is made by Mylan and sold as Fulphila.

Pharmaceutical variants
The recombinant human G-CSF (rhG-CSF) synthesised in an E. coli expression system is called filgrastim. The structure of filgrastim differs slightly from the structure of the natural glycoprotein. Most published studies have used filgrastim.

Filgrastim was first marketed by Amgen with the brand name Neupogen. Several bio-generic versions are now also available in markets such as Europe and Australia. Filgrastim (Neupogen) and PEG-filgrastim (Neulasta) are two commercially available forms of rhG-CSF. The PEG (polyethylene glycol) form has a much longer half-life, reducing the necessity of daily injections.

Another form of rhG-CSF called lenograstim is synthesised in Chinese Hamster Ovary cells (CHO cells). As this is a mammalian cell expression system, lenograstim is indistinguishable from the 174-amino acid natural human G-CSF. No clinical or therapeutic consequences of the differences between filgrastim and lenograstim have yet been identified, but there are no formal comparative studies.

Research
G-CSF when given early after exposure to radiation may improve white blood cell counts, and is stockpiled for use in radiation incidents.

Mesoblast planned in 2004 to use G-CSF to treat heart degeneration by injecting it into the blood-stream, plus SDF (stromal cell-derived factor) directly to the heart.

G-CSF has been shown to reduce inflammation, reduce amyloid beta burden, and reverse cognitive impairment in a mouse model of Alzheimer's disease.

Due to its neuroprotective properties, G-CSF is currently under investigation for cerebral ischemia in a clinical phase IIb  and several clinical pilot studies are published for other neurological disease such as amyotrophic lateral sclerosis A combination of human G-CSF and cord blood cells has been shown to reduce impairment from chronic traumatic brain injury in rats.

See also 
 PEGylation

References

Further reading

External links 
 
 

Growth factors
Peptide hormones
Amgen
Cytokines
Drugs acting on the blood and blood forming organs

fr:Filgrastim